Florasina Ware (7 December 1912 - 1981) was an American activist, radio show host, and foster mother in Seattle, Washington.

Ware led a number of campaigns in Seattle to improve living conditions for children, the elderly and the poor. She pressed school officials in the Central Area schools to improve the academic programmes, and later became an organizer of the Central Area School Board. She called for quality care for aged people and led the Meals on Wheels program in the city. She also called for more employment support for the poor.

Ware was involved with the Foster Parent Association and raised 20 foster children in her home. From 1968 to 1979 she hosted a radio talk show on Seattle station KRAB. In 1968 she led a group of around 50 indigenous and black people in a convoy of buses to Washington, D.C., to voice grievances about their living conditions; the group became known as the Poor People's Campaign. In the 1970s she sat on the King County Equal Opportunity Board and was involved in the Model Cities Program.

In 1982, a Seattle park was named for her. Artworks at University Street station also pay tribute to her work.

References

1912 births
1981 deaths
Activists from Seattle
African-American activists
20th-century African-American women
20th-century African-American people
20th-century American people